Boychinovtsi (also transliterated as Boichinovtsi, Boichovci, Boychonovci or Boychinovtzi) is a town (град) in northwestern Bulgaria, the administrative centre of Boychinovtsi Municipality, Montana Province. It is near the city of Montana. As of December 2009, the town has a population of 1,648 inhabitants.

References

Towns in Bulgaria
Populated places in Montana Province